A mucinous neoplasm (also called colloid neoplasm) is an abnormal and excessive growth of tissue (neoplasia) with associated mucin (a fluid that sometimes resembles thyroid colloid). It arises from epithelial cells that line certain internal organs and skin, and produce mucin (the main component of mucus). A malignant mucinous neoplasm is called a mucinous carcinoma. For example, for ovarian mucinous tumors, approximately 75% are benign, 10% are borderline and 15% are malignant.

Mucinous carcinoma
Over 40 percent of all mucinous carcinomas are colorectal.

When found within the skin, mucinous carcinoma is commonly a round, elevated, reddish, and sometimes ulcerated mass, usually located on the head and neck.

See also 
 Eccrine carcinoma
 Microcystic adnexal carcinoma
 Primary cutaneous adenoid cystic carcinoma
 List of cutaneous conditions
 Pseudomyxoma peritonei

Notes

References 
 
 Mucinous carcinoma entry in the public domain NCI Dictionary of Cancer Terms

Epidermal nevi, neoplasms, and cysts